The 2019 UC Santa Barbara Gauchos men's soccer team represented University of California, Santa Barbara during the 2019 NCAA Division I men's soccer season and the 2019 Big West Conference men's soccer season. The regular season began on August 30 and concluded on November 2. It was the program's 54th season fielding a men's varsity soccer team, and their 28th season in the Big West. The 2019 season was Tim Vom Steeg's twenty-first year as head coach for the program.

Roster

Schedule 

Source:

|-
!colspan=6 style=""| Non-conference regular season
|-

|-
!colspan=6 style=""| Big West Conference regular season
|-

|-
!colspan=6 style=""| Big West Conference Tournament
|-

|-
!colspan=6 style=""| NCAA Tournament
|-

References 

2019
UC Santa Barbara Gauchos
UC Santa Barbara Gauchos
UC Santa Barbara Gauchos men's soccer
Uc Santa Barbara Gauchos